Vasili Ivanovich Razumovsky (1857-1935) was a Russian Empire and Soviet surgeon, professor of surgery at Kazan University starting in 1887. Rasumovsky was among the founders of universities at Saratov (1909), Tbilisi (1918), and Baku (1919), and was the first rector of Baku State University (1919-1920). After 1920 he returned to Kazan University, and taught there until 1930.

External links
 Разумовский, Василий Иванович (Большая биографическая энциклопедия)

Scientists from the Russian Empire
Surgeons from the Russian Empire
Soviet scientists
Soviet surgeons
1857 births
1935 deaths
Rectors of Tbilisi State University
Academic staff of Baku State University